Events in the year 70 in Japan.

Incumbents
Monarch: Emperor Suinin

Deaths
Date unknown – Emperor Suinin dies at about age 138

References

70
1st century in Japan